This page shows the results of the Karate Competition for men and women at the 2003 Pan American Games, held from August 1 to August 17, 2003 in Santo Domingo, Dominican Republic.

Men's competition

Kata

Kumite (– 62 kg)

Kumite (– 68 kg)

Kumite (– 74 kg)

Kumite (– 80 kg)

Kumite (+ 80 kg)

Women's competition

Kata

Kumite (– 58 kg)

Kumite (+ 58 kg)

Medal table

References
 Sports 123

P
2003
Events at the 2003 Pan American Games